John Cobb, DCL (19 August 1678, in Adderbury – 10 December 1725, in Oxford) was a college leader in the first quarter of the 18th Century.

Dobson was educated at New College where he graduated BCL in 1705. He was Warden of New College, Oxford, from 1712 until 1720; and Warden of Winchester College from 1720 until his death. He held incumbencies at Newbottle, Albourne, Somerton and Stoke Lyne.

References

18th-century English people
Wardens of New College, Oxford
People from Oxfordshire (before 1974)
1678 deaths
1725 deaths